The National College of Music is an examination board established in 1894 and based in London, United Kingdom, offering external grade examinations in Music, Speech and Drama in the UK and overseas.

History 
The National College of Music was established as a school of music in 1894 by William J. Moss, the Moss family and several of their friends and patrons, and was later incorporated in 1898. Currently, it has a number of Examination Centres in the United Kingdom as well as several overseas in Europe, Australia and Malaysia.

Medal Examinations 
The College's Medal Examinations (Bronze, Silver and Gold) are offered for many musical instruments, including violin, cello, clarinet, flute, piano and others.

Diplomas 
The College's range of Diplomas, offered in Music, Speech and Drama, comprise the following levels:

Fellowships 
The College's Associate and Honorary Fellowships are awarded to professional musicians, conductors, choral directors, recitalists, composers, musicologists and those who have made an outstanding contribution to Music and to music education.

References

External links
National College of Music: Official Website

 

Performing arts education in the United Kingdom
Qualification awarding bodies in the United Kingdom
Classical music in the United Kingdom
Music education in the United Kingdom
Educational charities based in the United Kingdom
Educational institutions established in 1894
1894 establishments in the United Kingdom
1894 establishments in England
Organizations established in 1894
Performing arts in London
Music in London